Salorino may refer to:
Salorino, Cáceres, a municipality located in the province of Cáceres, Extremadura, Spain.
Salorino, a municipality incorporated in the municipality Mendrisio.